The 1996 Challenge Tour was the eighth season of the Challenge Tour, the official development tour to the European Tour. The tour started as the Satellite Tour with its first Order of Merit rankings in 1989 and was officially renamed as the Challenge Tour at the start of the 1990 season.

The Challenge Tour Rankings were won by England's Ian Garbutt.

Schedule
The following table lists official events during the 1996 season.

Unofficial events
The following events were sanctioned by the Challenge Tour, but did not carry official money, wins were still official however.

Challenge Tour Rankings
For full rankings, see 1996 Challenge Tour graduates.

The rankings were based on prize money won during the season, calculated in Pound sterling. The top 15 players on the tour earned status to play on the 1997 European Tour.

Notes

References

External links
Official homepage of the Challenge Tour

Challenge Tour seasons
Challenge Tour